Shahid Aziz is a Pakistani military author and a public official who served as the Chairman of National Accountability Bureau (NAB) from 2004–07, and university administrator of the Federal Urdu University in 2014–16. Aziz, a soldier who was trained in the United States in infantry tactics, saw military actions in war theater with India in 1999 through 2001. After retiring from the military, Aziz was the chairman of the National Accountability Bureau but was forced to resigned amid controversy.

Military career

Aziz graduated from the Pakistan Military Academy in April 1971 as the Battalion Senior Under Officer and received the Sword of Honour as well as the Presidents Gold Medal for his performance. He was commissioned in the 10 Battalion of the Baloch Regiment with which he actively participated in the 1971 India-Pakistan War and later on also commanded. He attended the Company Commander Course at Fort Benning, Georgia (USA) and the Command and General Staff Course at Fort Leavenworth, Kansas (USA). Aziz is also a graduate of the National Defence University, Pakistan. His military career has placed him in pivotal posts during critical periods in Pakistan. He served as the General Officer Commanding of the 12th Infantry Division stationed at Murree. During the Kargil conflict of 1999, he served as DG of the Inter-Services Intelligence (ISI) Agencies' Analysis Wing. That same year, he was appointed to the role of Director General Military Operations where he played a crucial role in the October 1999 Pakistani coup d'état that brought Pervez Musharraf to power. After the events of the September 11 attacks in 2001, he was serving as General Officer Commanding 12 Division when the United States invaded Afghanistan. Later that year he was appointed as Chief of General Staff at GHQ. He finally retired from the army in 2005 after having held the post of Lahore Corps Commander for two years during which time he also launched a massive inquiry against corruption in the Defence Housing Authority, Lahore.

Post-retirement
Aziz, created ripples by acknowledging in an article that regular troops were involved in the Kargil operation and the "misadventure" was a "four-man show" and details were initially hidden from the rest of the military commanders. He published a book Yeh Khamoshi Kahan Tak? Aik Sipahi ki Dastan-e-Ishq o Junoon(). General Musharraf, who served as the Chief of Army Staff during Kargil War, has refuted Lt. Gen. Aziz's claims in his book and referred to him as "unbalanced" during an interview when questioned about what had been claimed by Gen Shahid in his book. Shahid Aziz resigned from the Chairmanship of NAB on moral principles when requested to shut down all cases of Benazir Bhutto and Asif Ali Zardari amid back channel negotiations between Musharraf and Benazir Bhutto prior to passing of the National Reconciliation Ordinance.

In an answer to a question about his role in the coup by General Musharraf in violation of the law, Lt. Gen. Aziz said that he believed the constitution is a "rotten product." He was falsely accused by the Land Mafia Head of Bahria Residential Society for misuse of authority in attaining financial benefits for himself and his son-in-law after he ordered corruption inquiry against the same  renowned land grabber while being the Chairman of National Accountability Bureau. However, the General never bothered to deny the false claims of the accuser. Moreover, contrary to false news publication, no inquiry was ever conducted against the General.

Awards and decorations

References

 

|-
 

Pakistani generals
Living people
Pakistani military personnel of the Indo-Pakistani War of 1971
Pakistani military writers
People of the Kargil War
Chairmen of the National Accountability Bureau
Lieutenant generals
Pakistan Army personnel
Recipients of Hilal-i-Imtiaz
People from Lahore
Pakistan Military Academy alumni
1948 births
Pakistan Army officers
National Defence University, Pakistan alumni
Military personnel from Lahore
Pakistani Muslims
Non-U.S. alumni of the Command and General Staff College